Acacia Theatre Company is a Wisconsin-based professional theater company that integrates art and faith by presenting theatre from a Christian view. Acacia is a non-profit, interdenominational Christian ministry not affiliated with any particular denomination or church.

Acacia was founded in 1980 by several local theatre artists who shared a common desire to produce plays that would express the experiences and positive moral values important to us as members of the Christian faith. The name Acacia was chosen because the Acacia tree, as mentioned in Isaiah, is a symbol of stability and resilience, for its deep roots which help it survive and its wood, which was used to build the Ark of the Covenant. Beginning as a touring company, shows were taken to schools and churches all over Milwaukee. The touring aspect of the theatre continues to this day.

Acacia produces a season of four plays at a resident theatre, performs a special Christmas production each year and tours a repertoire of plays to various churches and community organizations.

Performances are at Concordia University's Todd Wehr Auditorium in Mequon, Wisconsin.

External links
Official website

Entertainment companies established in 1980
Theatre companies in Wisconsin
Ozaukee County, Wisconsin